In mathematics, the Reeb vector field, named after the French mathematician Georges Reeb, is a notion that appears in various domains of contact geometry including:

 in a contact manifold, given a contact 1-form , the Reeb vector field satisfies ,
 in particular, in the context of Sasakian manifold#The Reeb vector field.

References 

Contact geometry